Bassaniana, commonly called bark crab spiders, is a widespread genus of crab spiders that was first described by Embrik Strand in 1928.

Species
 it contains seven species, found in Europe, Asia, and North America:
Bassaniana baudueri (Simon, 1877) – Portugal, France, Germany, Austria, Slovakia, Hungary, Romania
Bassaniana birudis Im, Kim & Lee, 2021 – Korea
Bassaniana decorata (Karsch, 1879) – Russia (Far East), China, Korea, Japan
Bassaniana floridana (Banks, 1896) – USA
Bassaniana ora Seo, 1992 – Korea
Bassaniana utahensis (Gertsch, 1932) – USA, Canada
Bassaniana versicolor (Keyserling, 1880) (type) – North America

In synonymy:
B. aemula ) = Bassaniana versicolor (Keyserling, 1880)
B. albomaculatus (Kulczyński, 1891) = Bassaniana baudueri (Simon, 1877)
B. japonicus (Simon, 1886) = Bassaniana decorata (Karsch, 1879)
B. pichoni (Schenkel, 1963) = Bassaniana decorata (Karsch, 1879)
B. typica (Kishida, 1913) = Bassaniana decorata (Karsch, 1879)

See also
 List of Thomisidae species

References

Further reading

External links
Bassaniana at BugGuide

Araneomorphae genera
Spiders of Asia
Spiders of North America
Taxa named by Embrik Strand
Thomisidae